Gatillazo is a Spanish punk band formed in the Basque Country in 2005 by the former La Polla Records singer Evaristo Páramos.

Background 
After La Polla Records disbanding in 2003, Evaristo formed the band The Kagas with other musicians of the Basque punk scene. After releasing one album, the band was reformed as The Meas in 2004, and released one album as well. In 2005, Evaristo created Gatillazo with former members of La Polla, the guitarist Txiki and the drummer Tripi and other punk musicians from Spain.

In 2005, the band released their debut album to the Oihuka label, although it did not sell as well. Then, in 2007, the band released Dianas Legales, it was Gatillazo's most successful album, toured through by Europe and Latin America between 2007 and 2008.

Then in 2008, Gatillazo released their third studio album Sex Pastels with a DVD by a jam session, with songs from La Polla Records, The Kagas and own songs.

On April 2, 2013, the band's fifth album Siglo XXI was released.

Members 
Current Line-Up
Evaristo Páramos – vocals (2005-)
Txiki – guitar (2005-)
Tripi - drums (2005-)
Butonbiko - bass (2008-)
Angel – guitar (2009-)

Former members
Osoron – guitar (2005–2008)
Xabi – bass (2005–2006)
Mikel – bass (2006–2008)

Discography
Gatillazo (2005)
Dianas Legales (2007)
Sex Pastels (2008) CD+DVD
Sangre y Mierda (2011)
Siglo XXI (2013)
Cómo Convertirse en Nada (2016)

References

External links
 Official site

Basque music bands
Spanish punk rock groups
Musical groups established in 2005